The 2017–18 Regional Four Day Competition was the 52nd edition of the Regional Four Day Competition, the domestic first-class cricket competition for the countries of the West Indies Cricket Board (WICB). The competition ran from 26 October 2017 to 21 January 2018, with six matches being played as day/night fixtures.

Six teams contested the tournament – Barbados, Guyana, Jamaica, the Leeward Islands, Trinidad and Tobago, and the Windward Islands. Guyana were the defending champions and retained their title, finishing ahead of Barbados.

In December 2017, the round 6 fixture between Guyana and the Windward Islands finished as a tie. This was the 63rd tied game in more than 300 years of first-class cricket, and the first occurrence of a tied match in first-class cricket in the West Indies.

Points table

 Champions

Fixtures

Round 1

Round 2

Round 3

Round 4

Round 5

Round 6

Round 7

Round 8

Round 9

Round 10

References

External links
 Series home at ESPN Cricinfo

2017 in West Indian cricket
2018 in West Indian cricket
Regional Four Day Competition seasons
Regional Four Day Competition